Mercury(II) hydroxide or mercuric hydroxide is the metal hydroxide with the chemical formula Hg(OH)2. The compound has not been isolated in pure form, although it has been the subject of several studies.  Attempts to isolate Hg(OH)2 yield yellow solid HgO.

The solid has produced it by irradiating a frozen mixture of mercury, oxygen and hydrogen. The mixture had been produced by evaporating mercury atoms at 50 °C into a gas consisting of neon, argon or deuterium (in separate experiments) plus 2 to 8% hydrogen and 0.2 to 2.0% oxygen. The mixture was then condensed at 5 kelvins onto a caesium iodide window, through which it could be irradiated.

References 

Mercury(II) compounds
Hydroxides